Gnorimoschema alaskense is a moth in the family Gelechiidae. It was described by Povolný in 1967. It is found in North America, where it has been recorded from Alaska, Yukon, Saskatchewan, Colorado, Manitoba and South Dakota.

Forewings of the males are almost uniformly dark grey-brown with a hint of whitish markings in the apical third, while the female forewings are more extensively marked with whitish scales.

References

Gnorimoschema
Moths described in 1967